The 2018 Carlson Hockey Games were played between 19 and 22 April 2018. The Czech Republic, Finland, Sweden and Russia played a round-robin for a total of three games per team and six games in total. Five of the games were played in Pardubice, Czech Republic, and one game in Yaroslavl, Russia. The tournament was won by the Czech Republic. The tournament was part of the 2017–18 Euro Hockey Tour.

Standings

Games

All times are local.
Pardubice – (Central European Summer Time – UTC+2) Yaroslavl – (Central European Time – UTC+1)

References

Carlson
Sports competitions in Pardubice
Sport in Yaroslavl
Czech Hockey Games
Carlson
Carlson